Ilora Gillian Finlay, Baroness Finlay of Llandaff, FMedSci (born 23 February 1949) is a Welsh doctor, professor of palliative medicine, and a Crossbench member of the House of Lords.

Born the only daughter of Professor Charles Beaumont Benoy Downman, Ilora married Andrew Yule Finlay in 1972, with whom she has two children, but is now divorced.

She is a past president of the Royal Society of Medicine. She is a
professor of palliative medicine at Cardiff University School of Medicine, and is consultant at the Velindre Cancer Centre in Cardiff. On 28 June 2001, she was made a life peer as Baroness Finlay of Llandaff, of Llandaff in the County of South Glamorgan.

In 2003 she proposed a bill to ban smoking in public buildings in Wales, three years before it was eventually implemented.

In 2007, Lady Finlay introduced a private members bill seeking to change the current system of organ donation from 'opt in' to 'opt out'. Parliamentary timing did not allow for this bill to proceed but the principle continues to be debated. Two years later she succeeded in changing government policy on organ donation to allow potential organ donors to be able to specify a family member or close friend to whom they wish to donate their organ(s).

In March 2010, Baroness Finlay sponsored the Sunbeds (Regulation) Bill as it reached the House of Lords for scrutiny. With just weeks before the forthcoming general election, Baroness Finlay, with Government and Opposition front bench support, took the MP Julie Morgan's private members bill through its final stages, to Royal Assent.

Baroness Finlay is a co-chair of the All-Party Parliamentary Carbon Monoxide Group, which brings together parliamentarians committed to tackling carbon monoxide poisoning. In October 2011, following a six-month inquiry which she chaired, the Group produced a report entitled Preventing Carbon Monoxide Poisoning, including a number of recommendations for policy and behaviour change. Lady Finlay also chairs the All-Party Parliamentary Group on Dying Well, which promotes palliative care.

She is a Vice President of Marie Curie, Patron of The Trussell Trust's foodbank network in Wales, and the Motor Neurone Disease Association. She is also patron of Student Volunteering Cardiff She was a Founding Fellow of the Learned Society of Wales and is a Member of its inaugural Council. She is patron of the award-winning charity Students for Kids International Projects (1099804). In 2017, she was appointed one of two patrons of the Royal Microscopical Society, the other being fellow member of the House of Lords, Baroness Brown of Cambridge.

In March 2015, Finlay was awarded the Grassroot Diplomat Initiative Honouree for her vigorous champion to improving the care of dying patients.

In 2020, Finlay served as chairwoman of the Alcohol Harms Commission, which recommended that England establish a minimum unit price for alcohol.

She is a longstanding opponent of any change in the law on assisted suicide.

Arms

References

External links
Baroness Finlay of Llandaff at TheyWorkForYou.com
 
Baroness Finlay, Grassroot Diplomat

Living people 
20th-century Welsh medical doctors
21st-century Welsh medical doctors
Crossbench life peers 
People's peers 
Life peeresses created by Elizabeth II
Fellows of the Learned Society of Wales
Academics of Cardiff University
Welsh women medical doctors
Fellows of the Academy of Medical Sciences (United Kingdom)
Presidents of the Royal Society of Medicine
1949 births
Presidents of the Medical Women's Federation
20th-century women physicians
21st-century women physicians